Kalvin Orsi (born 15 April 1997) is a Scottish footballer who plays as a winger for Dumbarton. Orsi, who began his career with Aberdeen's youth sides, has previously played for St Mirren, Queen's Park and Brechin City.

Career
Orsi began his career in Aberdeen's youth sides, playing with the club for six seasons, without making an appearance for the senior side.

After his release by Aberdeen in May 2017, he signed a deal with Scottish Championship club St Mirren. He made his debut for St Mirren on 29 November 2016, as a substitute in a Scottish Cup match at home to Spartans. Orsi was loaned out to Scottish League One club Queen's Park for the second half of the 2016–17 season, and on his return was released by St Mirren.

Following a successful trial period, Orsi signed for recently promoted Scottish Championship side Brechin City on 14 July 2017.

Orsi signed with Greenock Morton in May 2019. After two seasons at Cappielow, Orsi joined Dumbarton in June 2021 - signing a two year deal with the club.

Career statistics

References

External links

1997 births
Living people
Scottish footballers
Association football midfielders
Aberdeen F.C. players
St Mirren F.C. players
Queen's Park F.C. players
Brechin City F.C. players
Scottish Professional Football League players
Greenock Morton F.C. players
Dumbarton F.C. players
Footballers from Glasgow